Andrés Felipe Salinas (born June 11, 1986) is a Colombian football defender, who currently plays for José Gálvez in the Torneo Descentralizado. Salinas is a product of the Millonarios youth system and played with the Millonarios first team since January, 2007.

Player career

After being promoted plays with Millonarios in the Torneo Internacional Copa Ciudad de Santa Fe in Santa Fe, Argentina. On October 31, 2007, scored his first senior goal at senior level against Boyacá Chicó F.C. in the Week Fifteen on Copa Mustang II match that won Millonarios (2:1).

Statistics

External links
 Andrés Salinas at BDFA.com.ar 

1986 births
Living people
Colombian footballers
Millonarios F.C. players
Real Cartagena footballers
Ayacucho FC footballers
José Gálvez FBC footballers
Colombian expatriate footballers
Expatriate footballers in Peru
Association football defenders
Footballers from Cali